Robert Blackburn (1885 – after 1909) was a Scottish professional footballer who played as a winger.

References

1885 births
Footballers from Edinburgh
Scottish footballers
Association football wingers
Raith Rovers F.C. players
Hamilton Academical F.C. players
Leith Athletic F.C. players
Newcastle United F.C. players
Aberdeen F.C. players
Grimsby Town F.C. players
English Football League players
Year of death missing